Jason Edward Lezak (born November 12, 1975) is an American former competitive swimmer and swimming executive. As a swimmer, Lezak specialized in the 50-meter and 100-meter freestyle races. His pro career lasted for nearly fifteen years, spanning four Olympic games and eight Olympic medals.

Lezak is best known for his performance at the 2008 Summer Olympics as the anchor for the United States during the men's 4×100-meter freestyle relay. It is widely considered to be one of the greatest Olympic swimming relay races of all-time.

Currently, Lezak serves as the general manager of the Cali Condors, which is part of the International Swimming League.

Personal life
Lezak was born in Irvine, California, the son of Linda (née Mann), a former elementary school science teacher, and David Lezak, a former leather goods salesman. He is Jewish. The name Lezak is pronounced Leh-Zhack and is Polish (short e). Lezak attended El Camino Real Elementary School (now Woodbury Elementary School) and Irvine High School, as well as the University of California, Santa Barbara. He swam for the UC Santa Barbara Gauchos swimming and diving team from 1995 to 1998. Lezak currently lives in Orange County, California with his wife Danielle and 3 kids.

Swimming career

Olympics
Lezak has competed in four Olympic Games, in 2000, 2004, 2008, and 2012, and has won eight Olympic medals; two bronze, two silver, and four gold.

2000 Olympics
Lezak earned his first long-course international swimming gold medal at the 2000 Summer Olympics in Sydney, where he was part of the 4×100-meter medley relay in the Olympics in Sydney. He also won a silver medal in the 4×100-meter freestyle relay.

2004 Olympics
Lezak competed in several events at the 2004 Olympic Games in Athens, Greece, and was a member of the 4×100-meter medley relay team that set a new world record and earned another gold medal at the games. Lezak also won a bronze medal in the 4×100-meter freestyle relay and finished fifth in the 50-meter freestyle.

2008 Olympics
At the 2008 Summer Olympics in Beijing, Lezak was the oldest male on the U.S. swim team.  He anchored the U.S. 4×100-meter freestyle relay team that won the gold medal and set a new world record. At the start of the leg, Lezak trailed French anchor Alain Bernard by nearly a full body length. In the final 25 meters, with Bernard still leading by half a body length, Lezak overtook Bernard. At the time, Lezak's split of 46.06 was the fastest 100-meter freestyle split ever by nearly 0.6 seconds (at the 2019 World Championships Duncan Scott swam a 46.14 in the 4×100-meter freestyle relay to reduce that margin to 0.08 seconds). The American team's final time of 3:08:24 was just 0.08 seconds ahead of the French team's 3:08.32, making it the closest finish in the event's history. Both teams finished nearly four seconds ahead of the previous world record.

Lezak also earned his first individual Olympic medal, having tied for bronze with Brazilian swimmer César Cielo Filho in the 100-meter freestyle with a time of 47.67.

In the final race of these games Lezak anchored the U.S. 4×100-meter medley relay to a gold medal securing Michael Phelps's final gold medal to break Mark Spitz's record.

2012 Olympics
Lezak qualified for his fourth Olympics at the 2012 United States Olympic Trials in Omaha, Nebraska. His sixth-place finish in the Olympic Trial finals was good enough to reach the London Games as a member of the U.S. 4×100-meter freestyle relay team. At the 2012 Summer Olympics in London, United Kingdom, Jimmy Feigen, Matt Grevers, Ricky Berens and Lezak swam for the U.S. team in the preliminaries.  Nathan Adrian, Michael Phelps, Cullen Jones and Ryan Lochte swam in the finals, and together all these competitors earned a silver medal for the team's second-place finish in the finals. Lezak became the first male swimmer in Olympic history to win four medals in the same event, the 4×100-meter freestyle relay.

Short course competitions
In short-course competitions, Lezak won five world championships: four relays including the 2002 4x100m freestyle and medley, and 2004 4x100m freestyle, and a gold in the 100-meter freestyle in 2004. Lezak has also won seven U.S. Championships, three times in the 50-meter freestyle and four in the 100-meter freestyle.

2009; Maccabiah Games

Lezak passed up on attending the 2009 World Aquatics Championships to compete in the 18th Maccabiah Games in Israel from July 12 to 29, 2009. Lezak was given the honor of lighting the Maccabiah torch at the Opening Ceremony. At the 2009 Maccabiah Games, Lezak won gold medals in the 50-meter freestyle, 100-meter freestyle, 4×100-meter freestyle relay, and 4×100-meter medley relay.

At the 2017 Maccabiah Games, in the special 4x50m relay race between Israeli and American all-star teams, American Olympic champions Lezak, Lenny Krayzelburg (four Olympic golds), and Anthony Ervin (three Olympic golds), with masters swimmer Alex Blavatnik, swam a time of 1:48.23 and defeated Israeli Olympians Guy Barnea, Yoav Bruck, Eran Groumi, and Tal Stricker, who had a time of 1:51.25.

Executive career
Lezak serves as the general manager for the Cali Condors which is part of the International Swimming League. In 2019 the inaugural year of the league the Condors finished third place in the finals. As the top finishing American team, the Condors were led by high scorers Caeleb Dressel and Lilly King.

Personal bests
His personal bests (long-course) are:

 50 m freestyle: 21.90
 100 m freestyle: 47.58 (former American record)
 100 m freestyle relay split 46.06 (fastest relay split ever, even though FINA does not recognize world records for relay splits, unless they were in the opening leg, as only the opening leg is done from a stationary start, whereas later swimmers can lean over in the process of diving as the preceding swimmer is coming in)

Accolades
In 2003 he was inducted into the Southern California Jewish Sports Hall of Fame. In 2006 he was inducted into the International Jewish Sports Hall of Fame.

See also

 List of select Jewish swimmers
 List of multiple Olympic gold medalists
 List of multiple Olympic gold medalists in one event
 List of multiple Summer Olympic medalists
 List of Olympic medalists in swimming (men)
 List of United States records in swimming
 List of World Aquatics Championships medalists in swimming (men)
 List of world records in swimming
 World record progression 4 × 100 metres freestyle relay
 World record progression 4 × 100 metres medley relay

References

External links

 
 
 
 
 

1975 births
Living people
American male freestyle swimmers
Jewish American sportspeople
Jewish swimmers
Maccabiah Games gold medalists for the United States
Maccabiah Games medalists in swimming
Medalists at the 2008 Summer Olympics
Medalists at the 2012 Summer Olympics
Medalists at the FINA World Swimming Championships (25 m)
Olympic bronze medalists for the United States in swimming
Olympic gold medalists for the United States in swimming
Olympic silver medalists for the United States in swimming
Sportspeople from Irvine, California
Swimmers at the 2000 Summer Olympics
Swimmers at the 2004 Summer Olympics
Swimmers at the 2008 Summer Olympics
Swimmers at the 2012 Summer Olympics
UC Santa Barbara Gauchos men's swimmers
World Aquatics Championships medalists in swimming
World record holders in swimming
Medalists at the 2004 Summer Olympics
Medalists at the 2000 Summer Olympics
Competitors at the 2009 Maccabiah Games
Competitors at the 2017 Maccabiah Games
Goodwill Games medalists in swimming
Universiade medalists in swimming
Universiade gold medalists for the United States
Medalists at the 1997 Summer Universiade
Competitors at the 2001 Goodwill Games
21st-century American Jews